The Saviem H was a range of medium/heavy trucks manufactured by the French manufacturers Saviem and Renault Véhicules Industriels between 1977 and 1980.

Characteristics

Dimensions
The cab used for the H range was the 875, an extended version of the Club of Four's 870 cab introduced in the lighter weight J range. The new cab was 240mm larger than the original. The H was offered as a tractor unit (HB) or rigid (HM).

Engines
It also mounted two MAN engines, the R5 and the R6.

References and sources
 The entry incorporates text translated from the Saviem French entry.

Vehicles introduced in 1977
Renault trucks
Saviem